is a Japanese photographer and director, known for her brightly colored photographs of flowers, goldfish, and landscapes.

Biography
Daughter of acclaimed theatre director Yukio Ninagawa, she first came to prominence in the late 1990s as part of Japan's 'Girly Photo' movement (in which amateurs took photos of daily objects). Her work was first exhibited outside Japan in 1997 at the Parisian concept store Colette (boutique), and in 2001 she received the 26th Kimura Ihei Award (Japan's most prestigious photography award).

In 2014, she was appointed as an executive board member of the Tokyo Organizing Committee for the Olympic and Paralympic Games of 2020.

Work
Ninagawa has enjoyed significant commercial success in fashion and advertising. She made her debut as a full-length film director in 2007 with Sakuran. In September 2010, her music video for the AKB48 song "Heavy Rotation" was released. She directed the live action film adaptation of the manga Helter Skelter in 2012. In 2020, her web series directorial debut was with Netflix's Followers.

Awards
1996: Grand Prize, 9th Shashin Hitotsubo Ten
1996: New Cosmos of Photography Excellence Award, Canon 
1998: Photo Encouragement Award, Konica 
2001: The 26th Kimura Ihei Award, Asahi Shimbun Publishing Co.  
2006: Ohara Museum of Art Prize
2012: Kaneto Shindo Award 2012

Photography
 Shikao Suga's "Aitai" album cover and artist photo (2013)

Exhibitions
Into Fiction/Reality, Iwaki City Art Museum, Fukushima, Japan, Apr 13 - May 26, 2019   
Taichung World Flora Exposition, Taichung, Taiwan, Nov 03, 2018 - Apr 24, 2019
Hotel Anteroom Kyoto, Kyoto, Japan, Jul 14, 2016 - Present     
Mika Ninagawa: Self-image, Hara Museum of Contemporary Art, Jan 24 – May 10, 2015
Mika's daydreaming theater  
 Parco Factory, Shibuya Tokyo, Japan, March 20, 2008 - April 7, 2008
 Sapporo Parco, Sapporo, Japan, April 25, 2008 - May 11, 2008
 Nagoya Parco, Nagoya, Japan, May 17, 2008 - June 2, 2008
 Sendai Parco, Sendai, Japan, August 21, 2008 - September 15, 2008

Filmography

Movies
Sakuran (2007)
Helter Skelter (2012)
Diner (2019) 
Ningen Shikkaku (2019)
 xxxHolic (2022)

TV and Web TV Series
Followers (2020, Netflix)

 Music videos 

Booksピンク・ローズ・スウィート : 蜷川実花写真集. Pink Rose Suite. Tokyo, Japan: Editions Treville, 2001. .A Piece of Heaven. Tokyo, Japan: Editions Treville, 2002. . Color photographs.Liquid Dreams. Tokyo, Japan: Editions Treville, 2003. . Color photographs.On Happiness - Contemporary Japanese Photography. with Midori Mitamura and Toshihiro Komatsu, eds. Tokyo, Japan: Editions Treville, 2003. . Color Photographs. Acid Bloom. Portland, Ore.: Nazraeli Press, 2004. . Color photographs.Floating Yesterday. Tokyo, Japan: Kodansha, 2005. . Color photographs.Mika's daydreaming theater Tokyo, Japan: Shueisha, 2008  . Color Photographs. Ninagawa Baroque. Tokyo, Japan: Artbeat Publishers, 2010. .Mika Ninagawa. New York : Rizzoli, 2010. . Color Photographs

Other projects
Ninagawa was involved in the interior design of the Bar & Cafè on the Bund cafe and bar in Shanghai, China.

Ninagawa was involved in designing the external livery of a new Genbi Shinkansen excursion train scheduled to be operated in Japan by JR East from spring 2016.

She appears alongside fellow Movie director Yūichi Fukuda, in a scene as a couple, in TV Tokyo's 2019 special 2-day drama starring Shun Oguri and Tsuyoshi Muro, "Futatsu no Sokoku" (Two homelands).

References

Yamauchi Hiroyasu ( "Hiroyasu Yamauchi"), "Mika Ninagawa", in Kōtarō Iizawa, ed., Nihon no shashinka 101'' (101 Japanese photographers). Tokyo: Shinshokan, 2008. . P.202.

External links
  
 Official blog 

Female music video directors
Japanese film directors
Japanese women film directors
Japanese music video directors
Japanese photographers
1972 births
Living people
People from Tokyo
Japanese women photographers
Japanese pop artists